The Dr. Buck–Stevens House, also known as the Octagon House is an historic octagonal house located on West Main Street in Brasher Falls, in the town of Brasher, St. Lawrence County, New York. It was built between 1855 and 1857 by Dr. Nathan Buck and his wife Elmira, who lived in it until 1867; John Stevens was one of many later owners.  It is a two-story residence on a raised basement.   It is constructed of stuccoed concrete rusticated to resemble cut stone masonry.  It has a two-story portico and is topped by a cupola.

It was listed on the National Register of Historic Places in 1982.

References

Houses on the National Register of Historic Places in New York (state)
Houses completed in 1857
Octagon houses in New York (state)
Houses in St. Lawrence County, New York
National Register of Historic Places in St. Lawrence County, New York
1857 establishments in New York (state)